Barbarofusus is a genus of sea snails, marine gastropod mollusks in the family Fasciolariidae, the spindle snails, the tulip snails and their allies.

Species
Species within the genus Barbarofusus include:
 † Barbarofusus barbarensis (Trask, 1855)
 Barbarofusus guadalupensis Callomon & Snyder, 2017
 Barbarofusus kobelti (Dall, 1877)
Species brought into synonymy
 Barbarofusus chocolatus Okutani, 1983: synonym of Fusinus chocolatus (Okutani, 1983)

References

External links
 Snyder M.A. (2003). Catalogue of the marine gastropod family Fasciolariidae. Academy of Natural Sciences. of Philadelphia, Special Publication. 21iii + 1–431